In the mathematical field of group theory, the Baumslag–Solitar groups are examples of two-generator one-relator groups that play an important role in combinatorial group theory and geometric group theory as (counter)examples and test-cases.  They are given by the group presentation

 

The relation in the presentation is called the Baumslag–Solitar relation.

The groups were defined by Gilbert Baumslag and Donald Solitar in 1962 to provide examples of non-Hopfian groups.  The groups contain residually finite groups, Hopfian groups that are not residually finite, and non-Hopfian groups.

Linear representation
Define 

It is worth noting that this will not, in general, be an isomorphism.

See also
Binary tiling

Notes

References
 
 Gilbert Baumslag and Donald Solitar, Some two-generator one-relator non-Hopfian groups, Bulletin of the American Mathematical Society 68 (1962), 199–201.  

Combinatorial group theory